Alaa Mohammed Hosni El Sayed Mubarak ( ) (born 26 November 1960 in Cairo) is an Egyptian businessman and the elder of two sons of Hosni Mubarak, the former President of Egypt who served from 1981 to 2011, and his wife Suzanne Mubarak.

Early life and education
Alaa Mubarak was born in Cairo to Suzanne Mubarak and Hosni Mubarak, He is of Welsh descent from his mother side. who became President of Egypt in 1981, ousted in 2011. Alaa attended St. George's College, Cairo and graduated from the American University in Cairo.

Career

Mubarak has kept a much lower profile than his younger brother, Gamal who was involved in politics prior to the Egyptian revolution of 2011.

In 2011, he was arrested together with his father and brother and three of them later convicted for corruption in 2014. Alaa and his brother were released in October 2015 after completing their four-year prison sentence, which included time already served. The EU had imposed sanctions on all three of them, and froze all assets that Mubarak disclosed.

Alaa Mubarak has been named in association with the Panama Papers. In 2013, the British Virgin Islands financial services discovered that Alaa Mubarak owned 'Pan World Investments', an investment fund for the Mubarak family of nearly $1 billion incorporated by Mossack Fonseca, who said he was introduced to them by Credit Suisse.

In September 2018, Alaa was arrested along with his brother Gamal, and accused of manipulating the stock market. Alaa's corruption conviction, along with the corruption convictions of his father and brother, was upheld by Egypt's Court of Cassation the same month as well. Both Alaa and his brother were later acquitted in February 2020 of the 2018 illicit share trading charge.

On 12 March 2021, the European Union revoked the sanctions against nine Egyptian individuals including Mubarak family, adopted since 2011.

Personal life
Mubarak is married to Heidy Rasekh, with whom he has had two sons, Muhammad and Omar Alaa Mubarak. Muhammad died on 18 May 2009, aged 12. It was announced that he had suffered a 'severe health crisis', which was identified as a brain haemorrhage. He was checked into the Maadi Military Hospital for a couple of hours before being flown to Paris for further care, where he later died. His body was returned and buried in Cairo.

References

External links

1960 births
The American University in Cairo alumni
Children of presidents of Egypt
Egyptian businesspeople
Living people
Egyptian Muslims
Egyptian people of Welsh descent
Alaa
St. George's College, Cairo alumni
People named in the Panama Papers
Sons of national leaders